Janet Rickord McCall Irwin  (née Smith; 14 September 1923 – 20 March 2009) was a New Zealand doctor who also practised in Australia. She was a doctor in student health at the University of Canterbury and University of Queensland, and an activist for women's health and broader social issues.

Early life 
Irwin was born in Rawene, New Zealand, on 14 September 1923. She was the daughter of Lucy Smith and Dr George McCall Smith, the founder of the Hokianga area health service. She had one brother Jock who died at the age of 10 in 1932.

Career 
Irwin studied medicine at the University of Otago for almost five years but disappointed her father by getting married before completing her degree. After her marriage ended she returned to medical school and graduated in 1963.  

She worked at the Royal Hospital for Sick Children in Edinburgh after winning a scholarship to study psychological problems in young people. Concluding that “every child should be a wanted child” she began campaigning for abortion law reform. 

Irwin took up a position at the University of Canterbury in student health, advocating on health issues of students especially women students. 

From 1974 to 1978 she was director of Student Health Services at the University of Queensland. She was also the university’s first sexual harassment conciliator. While living in Australia she served on government bodies on immigration, social welfare, health, women and criminal justice including the Better Health Commission and Criminal Justice Commission. Other spheres of activity included the Queensland Council for Civil Liberties, the Brisbane Women’s Network and other lobby groups.

Honours and awards 
Irwin was made a Member of the Order of Australia in 1991 for service to women’s affairs and the community. She was awarded a Centenary Medal in 2001.

Personal life 
Irwin’s parents, who were opposed to her marriage, did not attend her wedding to Air Force officer Peter Irwin in 1944. McCall Smith’s role at the wedding was fulfilled by Sir Douglas Robb. The Irwins lived at Paraparaumu. In 1948 McCall Smith and Lucy moved to Waikanae from Rawene to live near their daughter. The Irwins' marriage ended in 1962. They had three children.

Irwin died in Nelson on 20 March 2009.

A biography of Irwin A Prescription for Action: The Life of Dr Janet Irwin was published in 2016.

Publications 

 Furnival CM, Irwin JR, Gray GM. (1983) ‘Breast disease in young women. When is biopsy indicated?’ Medical Journal of Australia. Vol. 2, no. 4 p.167–9. doi: 10.5694/j.1326-5377.1983.tb122396.x. PMID: 6877161.
 Irwin, J, De Vries S, Wilson, SS, & Sparling, J. (1998). Raising girls: The pleasures, the perils, the pitfalls. Brisbane, Qld.: Pandanus Press.

Further reading 

 ‘Doctor became advocate for social justice.’ Otago Daily Times, 27 June 2009, p. 36.
 Irwin, J. ‘Going home to the Hokianga.’ North and South, September 1992, p. 34–36

References

External links 

 ‘The life of Dr Janet Irwin’ on ABC, 2 April 2017
 Janet Irwin interviewed by Eddie Clarke, Queensland Council for Civil Liberties, 11 July 2006 on UQ eSPACE 

1923 births
2009 deaths
People from the Hokianga
20th-century New Zealand medical doctors
Members of the Order of Australia
University of Otago alumni